St. Ursula Academy is Toledo's oldest, all-female, Catholic fully accredited, college preparatory school serving girls in grades 6-12 and has been educating students since 1854.

St. Ursula's motto is "Soli Deo Gloria," meaning "For the Glory of God Alone."

History
In December 1854, four Ursuline nuns arrived in Toledo, Ohio. Several days after their arrival from nearby Cleveland, Ohio, they began to operate classes on Cherry Street in downtown Toledo. These classes were offered roughly 200 students, ranging in grade level. The nuns moved into a property located on Cherry and Erie streets in 1859. The early curriculum consisted of courses in English, German, French, history, art, music, natural sciences, mathematics, cooking, and sewing. There were two primary departments in the school: elementary and collegiate.

In 1905, the school relocated to Collingwood Boulevard to a recently purchased facility that included a new convent and academy. As the school began to expand and Mary Manse College opened in 1922, the Ursulines decided to move to a new location on Indian Road. The new building opened for the first time for classes in 1959. Renovations in 2000 included the addition of the Mary Ann LaValley Activities Center, which added four new classrooms, athletic offices, a field house, fitness center, and a dance studio. Further renovations in 2018 added a black box theater, a welcome lobby, an updated Dining Commons, and a state-of-the-art science lab.

Academics
SUA operates on the collegiate block schedule (also referred to as the 4x4 Collegiate Block). Students take four 80-minute classes in each semester and rotate most classes at the end of the first semester. Exceptions to this format are extended AP courses and nine-week, "term-long" classes. In the middle of the day, students also have a "seminar" period during which they can work on assignments, seek assistance from teachers, and collaborate on group projects.

Core courses provide a student with 23 academic credits for graduation, out of 31.5 units of academic credit required: English (4.5 units), Math (4 units), Social Studies (3 units), Science (3 units), Foreign Language (2 units), Theology (4 units), Computer Application (.5 unit), Health (.5 unit), Fine Art (1 unit), Physical Education (.5 unit), and Personal Finance (.5 credit).

Twenty classes are offered in an honors format, such as English, American Literature, Pre-Calculus, Algebra, Geometry, Chemistry, Biology, Physics, Anatomy & Physiology, World History, French, and Spanish, Vocal Music. Eighteen classes are offered at an AP level as well, including Calculus, Chemistry, English Literature, Human Geography, Psychology, Statistics, US Government, and US History. 

SUA also offers many elective courses, including Film, Speech, Science, Literature, Economics, Design, Single Survival Life Skills, The Art of Musical Theater, Dance, Psychology, Women's Health, and others.

Student life

Campus Ministry
Campus Ministry focuses on spiritual growth and sponsors service projects and class retreats retreats, including Kairos. Campus Ministry encourages students to reach out by volunteering and helps them to earn 60 hours of volunteer credit required for graduation. Each year, SUA students volunteer more than 10,000 hours working in nursing homes, tutoring underprivileged children, and assisting with disaster relief, among other efforts.

Athletics
St. Ursula Academy has summer athletic camps, a fitness room to support its 13 varsity sports, including basketball, crew, cross country, dance, diving, golf, gymnastics, lacrosse, soccer, softball, tennis, track, and volleyball. SUA had been a member of the Toledo City League for all athletic competition until joining the Three Rivers Athletic Conference in 2011. After the 2022-2023 academic year, SUA will join the Catholic High School League based in the Detroit area, but will also play independent matches in some sports.

State championships

 Dance - 2014 (Pom and Jazz), 2015 (Pom, Jazz, and Hip Hop), and state championships in pom and jazz through 2022; the Dance Team also won a national title in small pom in the 2020 season
 Volleyball - 2004, 2010
 Softball - 2004
 Swimming - 1983

Clubs
Language and culture clubs are popular, such as the Afro-American Club, Anime Club, Spanish Club, and French Club. Government and law clubs include the Mock Trial Team, Model UN, and Student Council.  Academic and leadership clubs are available, such as the National Honor Society and Ambassador Society.

Many other clubs are created each year. Some of these include the Art Club, Fashion Club, Yearbook, Zonta Club, Harry Potter Club, STEM Club, and Spirit Squad.

Campus

SUA's campus on Indian Road sits on a property adjacent to the Ursuline Center. The school campus includes the school building, a softball field, and a multi-use recreational field. Soccer and lacrosse games take place on this space in the fall and spring, respectively. Recent renovations include an improved Dining Commons, a Black Box theatre, and a new science lab.

Notable Alumnae

 Marcy Kaptur 1964 - US Representative
 Joyce E. Jesionowski 1965 - author of D. W. Griffith: Thinking in Pictures
 Dr. Linda Sheidler Doyle 1967 - Retired President and CEO of Harvard Business School Publishing Company
 Dr. Joan Breton Connelly 1972 - American classical archaeologist and Professor of Classics and Art History at New York
 Elizabeth Witherell 1973 - editor-in-chief of The Writings of Henry D. Thoreau
 Tricia Martineau Wagner 1974 - author or African American Women of the Old West
 Shirley Murdock 1975 - R&B/gospel singer-songwriter 
 Laurie Winters 1977 - Milwaukee Art Museum curator
 Philana Marie Boles 1994 - author of Glitz, Little Divas, In the Paint, and Blame It on Eve
 Runa Lucienne 2006 - model and actress
 Josie Fouts 2009 - Cyclist, Team USA. 2018 Paralympics Track Cycling National Championships, individual pursuit & time trial, gold

See also
Ursulines
Roman Catholic Diocese of Toledo
Beaumont School (Ohio)
Ursuline Academy (Cincinnati, Ohio)

References

Catholic secondary schools in Ohio
Girls' schools in Ohio
High schools in Toledo, Ohio
Educational institutions established in 1854
1854 establishments in Ohio